Samson Olajidie Oyeledun (born 10 January 1954) is a Nigerian former sprinter. He competed in the 1980 Summer Olympics and in the 1984 Summer Olympics. He also competed in the 1982 Commonwealth Games where he won gold in the 4 x 100 metres relay, as well as running in the 100 metres and 200 metres sprint.

References

External links 
 
 

1958 births
Living people
Nigerian male sprinters
Olympic athletes of Nigeria
Athletes (track and field) at the 1980 Summer Olympics
Athletes (track and field) at the 1984 Summer Olympics
Athletes (track and field) at the 1982 Commonwealth Games
Commonwealth Games gold medallists for Nigeria
Commonwealth Games medallists in athletics
Medallists at the 1982 Commonwealth Games